The siege of Maastricht took place in April–May 1748 during the War of the Austrian Succession. A French force under the overall command of Maurice de Saxe besieged and captured the Dutch barrier fortress of Maastricht in the final few months of the campaign in the Low Countries. After a relatively long siege the garrison of Maastricht capitulated and marched out with the honours of war. Maastricht was returned along with France's conquests in the Austrian Netherlands according to the Treaty of Aix-la-Chapelle signed in 1748.

Among the defenders were the Austro-Walloon Regiment of Los Rios, commanded by its Colonel Jean Charles Joseph, Count of Merode, Marquis of Deynze ; Charles, 5th Duke of Arenberg (Jean Charles' brother-in-law)

References

Sources

 Browning, Reed. The War of the Austrian Succession. Alan Sutton Publishing, 1994.
 

Conflicts in 1748
1748 in the Dutch Republic
Sieges of the War of the Austrian Succession
Sieges involving the Dutch Republic
Sieges involving France
Battles in Limburg (Netherlands)
Siege
Events in Maastricht